This is a list of all lighthouses in the U.S. state of Massachusetts as identified by the United States Coast Guard. Enumeration of the lighthouses in this state is complicated by the number of multiple tower stations and replacement of older towers, with the Brant Point Light station having had nine towers, two of which survive. At present there are forty-seven active towers, of which eleven are privately maintained; thirteen are standing but inactive, seven have been replaced with skeleton towers, thirteen have been destroyed or removed, and one tower has been moved to another state. The oldest station, Boston Light, established in 1716, was the first lighthouse built in the colonies, and the current tower at that station, built in 1783, is the oldest survivor in the state and the second oldest in the nation, and was the last lighthouse automated in the United States. The last station established was at the Buzzards Bay Entrance Light in 1961 (since replaced by an automated light on a steel tripod), but in 1986 the 1818 Great Point Light was rebuilt and relit, making it the last tower constructed in the state. The tallest towers in the state are the two Cape Ann Light towers, but the highest focal plane is at the Hospital Point Range Rear Light, which is located in the steeple of the First Baptist Church of Beverly.

A number of inactivated Massachusetts lights have met with unusual fates. The Three Sisters of Nauset were sold off to separate private buyers before being purchased by the National Park Service and moved back near their original site. Range lights in Nantucket and Hyannis were incorporated into private dwellings, the former housing the Gilbreth family of Cheaper by the Dozen fame. The Point Gammon Light was converted into an observation tower for birdwatching.

If not otherwise noted, focal height and coordinates are taken from the United States Coast Guard Light List, while location and dates of activation, automation, and deactivation are taken from the United States Coast Guard Historical information site for lighthouses. Lighthouses in the "Former" section only include structures that no longer exist.

Existing lighthouses

Traditional

Modern
The United States Coast Guard lists these as active lighthouses.

Former lighthouses

See also
List of lighthouses in Maine
Lighthouses in New Hampshire and Vermont
List of lighthouses in Rhode Island
List of lighthouses in Connecticut
List of lighthouses in New York (state)

Notes

References 

Massachusetts
 
Lighthouses
Lighthouses